Konstantin Ivanov Slavchev also known as Konstantin is a Bulgarian pop-folk singer. He was the winner of the Bulgarian reality show VIP Brother 1 in 2006.

Biography 
Konstantin was born on 17 July 1976 in Sofia, Bulgaria. His mother Maryana is a teacher and his father Ivan works at the Ministry of Interior. Konstantin has a brother named Svetoslav. As a child, he trained and played football. Konstantin was in relationship with the singer Rayna for many years.

Career 
His career began at the Bulgarian music company, Orpheus Music in 1999. In 1999 he released his debut song, the pop-folk fan favorite Черна роза(). The song became a total hit and Konstantin directly became one of the big names in pop folk.

Personal life 
In 2010 Konstantin married his girlfriend Nadezhda. The couple has a daughter Maryana and son Aleksandar

Discography

Albums 
Черна роза (Black Rose) (1999)
Върни се (Come back) (2001)
Като сън (Like a dream) (2003)
Червило (Lipstick) (2004)
Обади ми се (Call me) (2006)
Константин (Konstantin) (2010)
Докато сърцето бие (While the heart beats) (2016)

Sources

External links
Information about Konstantin(Bulgarian)
Article about Konstantin

1976 births
21st-century Bulgarian male singers
Bulgarian folk-pop singers
Living people
Bulgarian folk singers
Big Brother (Bulgarian TV series) contestants